Stick It is a 2006 American teen comedy-drama film starring Jeff Bridges, Missy Peregrym and Vanessa Lengies written and directed by Bring It On writer Jessica Bendinger; the film marks her directorial debut. It was produced by Touchstone Pictures and Spyglass Entertainment and was released in theatres on April 28, 2006.

Plot
Haley Graham (Peregrym) is a rebellious 17-year-old who has a run-in with the law when she and two friends go biking through a residential construction site in Plano, Texas. Haley is arrested and forced by a judge to return to the regimented world of competitive gymnastics.

Haley was once considered one of the most talented gymnasts in the U.S. One year earlier, she made it to the World Championships, but she walked out of competition in the middle of the finals, costing the American team the gold medal and leaving many people hurt and crushed, making her one of the most hated people in gymnastics, if not the most hated.

Haley goes to the elite Vickerman Gymnastics Academy (VGA) in Houston, her ultimate nightmare, run by legendary coach Burt Vickerman (Bridges). Haley has a talk with Coach Vickerman, who convinces her to take up the sport once again, at least until she can enter an upcoming invitational competition. Vickerman convinces her that she can use the prize money from the competition to repay some property damage debts she still owes and leave gymnastics once and for all. Disliking the sport's rigid rules and intense training schedule, Haley is reluctant to come out of retirement. Her attitude toward her fellow gymnasts—as well as her past—causes conflicts.

At the invitational, Haley's talent shines and her return from gymnastics retirement seems for the better. But all is not what it seems in the scoring system. She starts to remember one of the many reasons why she retired to begin with: the flaws in judging. The panels do not look at the difficulty of the move nor do they look at the technique; they merely take deductions for unimportant minor errors. As Haley says, "It doesn't matter how well you do. It's how well you follow their rules."

In addition, Haley is severely stressed by her domineering mother, Alice (Gia Carides), who has arrived to watch the meet. Her conduct at the World Championship ("Worlds") has not been forgotten by the other athletes and they treat her with open hostility. Haley finally breaks down in the middle of her balance beam routine and, in a repeat of the World Championships a year earlier, leaves the arena before completing the competition. However, before she leaves, she reveals to Vickerman the reason why she walked out of Worlds, singlehandedly costing the American team the gold medal in the process: she had just discovered that her mother was having an affair with her previous coach and her parents got divorced as a result.

Haley then goes back to the judge who sentenced her to the gymnastics academy to inform her that she has dropped out and wants to be sent to either a juvenile hall or military academy, but the judge tells Haley that someone (obviously Vickerman) had just paid off all of her debt for the property damages in her incident with the law, meaning she is no longer under any legal issues and having jerks for parents doesn't need to ruin her life.

Haley then approaches Vickerman, who confirms it by claiming that he used the money that her father had paid him for her gymnastics training. Vickerman persuades Haley to remain with the academy a while longer so she can continue with her training to reach Nationals. Although she did not complete the invitational, Haley continues to train and, with three of her teammates Mina Hoyt (Maddy Curley), Wei Wei Yong (Nikki SooHoo) and Joanne Charis (Lengies), qualifies for the National Championships.

The biased judging leaves her far back in the all-around standings, but this does not keep her out of the event finals. In the first event final, vault, Mina executes an extremely difficult maneuver perfectly but receives a low score (9.5 out of 10). When Vickerman questions the judges, he learns that Mina was penalized on the technicality of showing a bra strap. Haley is next up. However, instead of vaulting, she shows her bra strap to the judges and forfeits her turn in disgust (otherwise known as a "scratch"). One by one, the other gymnasts follow suit, earning a string of zeroes and forcing the judges to award Mina the vault gold medal anyway.

Haley's bold action sparks a movement. The gymnasts talk among themselves and realize that if they could choose the winner, the judging would be fair. They convince all the others in the competition to do the same, choosing one person from each event who they, by consensus, deem the best to be the "winner".

The winner completes her routine; the others jump on and off the apparatus and scratch. It seems the movement will be ruined when Tricia Skilken (Tarah Paige), a longtime judges' favorite and Haley's former teammate and best friend, arrives and threatens the choice of winners by competing herself, but Tricia ends up joining the movement and scratches in the last event as well. What started out as a gymnastics competition turns into a small revolution for the rules and Haley, whose talents are recognized once more and her future seems to be set with numerous colleges offering her athletic scholarships to compete in NCAA gymnastics.

Cast
 Missy Peregrym as Haley Graham
 Jeff Bridges as Burt Vickerman
 Vanessa Lengies as Joanne Charis
 Maddy Curley as Mina Hoyt
 Nikki SooHoo as Wei Wei Yong
 Kellan Lutz as Frank
 John Patrick Amedori as Poot
 Tarah Paige as Tricia Skilken
 Jon Gries as Brice Graham
 Gia Carides as Alice Graham
 John Kapelos as Chris DeFrank
 Julie Warner as Phyllis Charis
 Andrea Bendewald as Madison's Mom

Doubles
 Isabelle Severino – Missy Peregrym's gymnastics double (main)
 Jessica Miyagi – Missy Peregrym's gymnastics double (beam routine – IG Classic)
 Annie Gagnon – Vanessa Lengies's gymnastics double
 Kate Stopper – Maddy Curley's gymnastics double
 Tacia Van Vleet – Nikki SooHoo's gymnastics double

Cameos
 Tim Daggett – Himself
 Elfi Schlegel – Herself
 Bart Conner – Himself
 Carly Patterson – Herself
 Nastia Liukin – Herself
 Valeri Liukin – Himself (Nastia Liukin's spotter in her uneven bars routine)
 Mohini Bhardwaj
 Allana Slater
 Yang Yun

Soundtrack
 We Run This – Missy Elliott (Stick It Edit)
 Abra Cadabra – Talib Kweli
 Beware of the Boys – Panjabi MC (Mundian To Bach Ke)
 Fire Fire – Fannypack/Mr. Vegas
 Dance Commander – Electric Six
 Game, The – Jurassic 5
 If I Only Knew – Lisa Lavie
 Breakdown – The Toques featuring Mark Foster
 Nu Nu (Yeah Yeah) – Fannypack (Double J & Hayze Extended mix)
 Crowded – Jeannie Ortega/Papoose
 Anthem Part Two – Blink-182
 Hittin' The Bars – Mike Simpson
 Come Baby Come – K7
 Outta My Way – Damone
 Love Song – J.P. Amedori (Bonus Track)

The movie also features brief pieces of other songs, which were not included in the soundtrack, including Green Day's "Brain Stew" and "Holiday," My Morning Jacket's "One Big Holiday" and Fall Out Boy's "Our Lawyer Made Us Change The Name Of This Song So We Wouldn't Get Sued" and "I Slept With Someone in Fall Out Boy and All I Got Was this Stupid Song Written About Me."

Reception

Box office
Stick It was released on April 28, 2006 and grossed $10,803,610 in the opening weekend. The movie grossed $26,910,736 total in the domestic market and  $5,066,112 internationally for a total of $31,976,848 after 13 weeks at the box office. The film had the highest per screen average on its opening weekend with 2,038 movie theaters, making an average of $5,301 per screen.

Critical response
On Rotten Tomatoes, the film has a score of 31%, based on 100 reviews, with an average rating of 5/10. The site's consensus states: "Director Jessica Bendinger is unable to transfer her winning Bring It On formula to the world of gymnastics, despite Missy Peregrym's strong lead performance." On Metacritic, it has a score of 52 out 100, based on reviews from 25 critics. Audiences surveyed by CinemaScore gave it a grade of B+. Critic Nathan Lee of The New York Times gave the film a positive review, stating, "A spry teenage comedy that gets everything right, Stick It takes the usual batch of underdogs, dirt bags, mean girls and bimbos and sends them somersaulting through happy clichés and unexpected invention." Roger Ebert gave the film 2 out of 4 and wrote: "The movie seems to fear that if it pauses long enough to actually be about gymnastics, the audience will grow restless."

See also
 Make It or Break It, a television series that was inspired by this film 
 Code of Points (artistic gymnastics)

References

External links

 
 
 

2006 films
2006 comedy-drama films
2006 directorial debut films
2000s sports comedy-drama films
2000s teen comedy-drama films
American sports comedy-drama films
American teen comedy-drama films
2000s English-language films
Gymnastics films
Films about women's sports
Films set in Houston
Films shot in Los Angeles
Spyglass Entertainment films
Teen sports films
Touchstone Pictures films
2000s female buddy films
2000s American films